Wembley Central is an electoral ward of the London Borough of Brent. It was expanded in 2002 to include part of the Barham ward, which was abolished. The population of the ward at the 2011 Census was 14,727.

References

Wards of the London Borough of Brent